Opecoelidae is a family of trematodes. It is the largest digenean family with over 90 genera and nearly 900 species, almost solely found in marine and freshwater teleost fishes. It was considered by Bray et al. to belong in the superfamily Opecoeloidea Ozaki, 1925 or the Brachycladioidea Odhner, 1905.

Genera
Family Opecoelidae
Subfamily Bathycreadiinae Martin, Huston, Cutmore & Cribb, 2018
Genus Bathycreadium Kabata, 1961
Subfamily Hamacreadiinae Martin, Downie & Cribb, 2019
Genus Allopodocotyle Pritchard, 1966
Genus Bentholebouria Andres, Pulis & Overstreet, 2014
Genus Cainocreadium Nicoll, 1909
Genus Choanotrema Nitta & Tanaka, 2018
Genus Hamacreadium Linton, 1910
Genus Pacificreadium Durio & Manter, 1968
Genus Paraplagioporus Yamaguti, 1939
Genus Pedunculacetabulum Yamaguti, 1934
Genus Podocotyloides Yamaguti, 1934
Subfamily Helicometrinae Bray, Cribb, Littlewood & Waeschenbach, 2016
Genus Helicometra Odhner, 1902
Genus Helicometrina Linton, 1910
Genus Neohelicometra Siddiqi & Cable, 1960
Subfamily Opecoelinae Ozaki, 1925
Genus Anisoporus Ozaki, 1928
Genus Anomalotrema Zhukov, 1957
Genus Apertile Overstreet, 1969
Genus Coitocaecum Nicoll, 1915
Genus Dactylomyza Aken'Ova, 2003
Genus Dactylostomum Woolcock, 1935
Genus Dimerosaccus Shimazu, 1980
Genus Discoverytrema Gibson, 1976
Genus Genitocotyle Park, 1937
Genus Labracetabulum Reimer, 1987
Genus Manteriella Yamaguti, 1958
Genus Margolisia Bray, 1987
Genus Neodactylostomum Toman, 1996
Genus Notoporus Yamaguti, 1938
Genus Opecoeloides Odhner, 1928
Genus Opecoelus Ozaki, 1925
Genus Opegaster Ozaki, 1928
Genus Paropecoelus Pritchard, 1966
Genus Parvacreadium Manter, 1940
Genus Poracanthium Dollfus, 1948
Genus Pseudopecoeloides Yamaguti, 1940
Genus Pseudopecoelus von Wicklen, 1946
Subfamily Opecoelininae Gibson & Bray, 1984
Genus Bartoliella Aken'Ova, 2003
Genus Opecoelina Manter, 1934
Subfamily Opistholebetinae Fukui, 1929
Genus Gaevskajatrema Gibson & Bray, 1982
Genus Heterolebes Ozaki, 1935
Genus Maculifer Nicoll, 1915
Genus Macvicaria Gibson & Bray, 1982
Genus Magnaosimum Martin, Crouch, Cutmore & Cribb, 2018
Genus Opistholebes Nicoll, 1915
Genus Pachycreadium Manter, 1954
Genus Parallelolebes Martin, Ribu, Cutmore & Cribb, 2018
Genus Peracreadium Nicoll, 1909
Genus Pinguitrema Siddiqi & Cable, 1960
Genus Propycnadenoides Fischthal & Kuntz, 1964
Genus Pseudoheterolebes Yamaguti, 1959
Genus Pseudopycnadena Saad-Fares & Maillard, 1986
Genus Pycnadena Linton, 1910
Genus Pycnadenoides Yamaguti, 1938
Subfamily Plagioporinae Manter, 1947
Genus Anthochoanocotyle Kamegai, 1972
Genus Choerodonicola Cribb, 2005
Genus Decemtestis Yamaguti, 1934
Genus Diplobulbus Yamaguti, 1934
Genus Eucreadium Dayal, 1942
Genus Heterochoanostoma Machida, 2014
Genus Hysterogonia Hanson, 1955
Genus Jerguillicola Bray, 2002
Genus Mesocreadium Reimer, 1987
Genus Multivitellina Schell, 1974
Genus Neochoanostoma Bray & Cribb, 1989
Genus Neopecoelina Gupta, 1955
Genus Neoplagioporus Shimazu, 1990
Genus Neopodocotyle Dayal, 1950
Genus Nezpercella Schell, 1974
Genus Nicolla Wisniewski, 1933
Genus Paramanteriella Li, Qiu & Zhang, 1988
Genus Pellamyzon Montgomery, 1957
Genus Phyllotrema Yamaguti, 1934
Genus Plagiocirrus Van Cleave & Mueller, 1932
Genus Plagioporus Stafford, 1904
Genus Proneohelicometra Hassanine, 2006
Genus Pseudopodocotyle Caballero Rodríguez, 1970
Genus Pseudosphaerostomum Koval & Shevchenko, 1970
Genus Pseudurorchis Yamaguti, 1971
Genus Sphaerostoma Rudolphi, 1809
Genus Thynstenopera Bilqees & Khatoon, 2004
Genus Trilobovarium Martin, Cutmore & Cribb, 2017
Genus Urorchis Ozaki, 1927
Genus Vesicocoelium Tang, Hsu, Huang & Lu, 1975
Genus Villarrealina Bolaños & Salas, 1982
Subfamily Podocotylinae Dollfus, 1959
Genus Bathypodocotyle Martin, Huston, Cutmore & Cribb, 2018
Genus Buticulotrema Blend, Dronen & McEachran, 1993
Genus Halosaurotrema Martin, Huston, Cutmore & Cribb, 2018
Genus Macrourimegatrema Blend, Dronen & Armstrong, 2004
Genus Neolebouria Gibson, 1976
Genus Podocotyle Dujardin, 1845
Genus Tellervotrema Gibson & Bray, 1982
Subfamily Pseudoplagioporinae Martin, Cutmore & Cribb, 2019
Genus Fairfaxia Cribb, 1989
Genus Pseudoplagioporus Yamaguti, 1938
Genus Shimazuia Cribb, 2005
Subfamily Stenakrinae Yamaguti, 1970
Genus Biospeedotrema Bray, Waeschenbach, Dyal, Littlewood & Morand, 2014
Genus Caudotestis Issaitschikov, 1928
Genus Hexagrammia Baeva, 1965
Genus Holsworthotrema Martin, Huston, Cutmore & Cribb, 2018
Genus Neonotoporus Srivastava, 1942
Genus Pseudopecoelina Yamaguti, 1942
Genus Scorpidotrema Aken'Ova & Cribb, 2003
Genus Stenakron Stafford, 1904
Genera incertae sedis
Genus Abyssopedunculus Martin, Huston, Cutmore & Cribb, 2018
Genus Mesobathylebouria Martin, Huston, Cutmore & Cribb, 2018

References

 
Trematode families
Plagiorchiida